Basileunculus is a genus of flies in the family Pipunculidae.

Species
Basileunculus aliceae Rafael, 1987
Basileunculus interruptus (Malloch, 1912)
Basileunculus rex (Curran, 1934)

References

Pipunculidae
Syrphoidea genera
Diptera of South America